AVC may refer to:

Organizations
 Asian Volleyball Confederation, the continental governing body for the sport of volleyball  in Asia
 Advanced Video Communications, owner of Stickam
 ¡Alfaro Vive, Carajo!, a defunct left-wing group in Ecuador
 American Viscose Corporation, a former maker of rayon and other synthetic fibers
 Antelope Valley College, a community college in Lancaster, California
 Association of Vineyard Churches, a Protestant Christian denomination based in North America
 Atlantic Veterinary College, on Prince Edward Island, Canada
 Bureau of Arms Control, Verification, and Compliance, a bureau within the U.S. Department of State

Technology
 Advanced Video Coding (a.k.a. H.264), a digital video compression format
 Access vector cache, in implementations of Security-Enhanced Linux
 Aluminum vehicle carrier, a type of autorack, a railroad freight car
 Automated vehicle classification
 Automatic volume control, a way of compensating for fading of radio signals

Other uses
 Assurance of voluntary compliance, a legal device
 Atrioventricular canal
 Average variable cost, a metric used in economics